Ali Nasir (born 7 October 1978) is a news anchor, media person, broadcast journalist and economist from Pakistan.  He regularly appears on Geo News, Dawn News, Business Plus, SAMAA TV, AAJ TV, Metro One, News One (Pakistani TV channel), Din News, Waqt News, Royal News, and Indus News. 
He is currently the anchor of Insight on Business Plus, a program that focuses on successful businessmen in Pakistan. He has previously anchored current affairs programs on Waqt News. He also appears as an analyst on AAJ Markets (AAJ TV), Morning Shout (Business Plus), and Daily Business (INN-Indus News).
Nasir also narrated and hosted a documentary on Quaid-e-Azam, the founder of Pakistan (in English). 
Nasir has been awarded the best anchor in the business category on 22 February (7th Consumer Choice Awards).

References

Living people
Pakistani economists
Pakistani television hosts
1978 births
People from Sialkot